Michael Johns (born September 8, 1964) is an American conservative commentator, policy analyst, writer, a former speechwriter for President George H. W. Bush, and a leader and spokesman in the Tea Party movement. He was also a health care executive.

Early life and education
Johns was born in Allentown, Pennsylvania, and graduated from Emmaus High School. He graduated from the University of Miami in 1986, receiving a bachelor's degree in business administration with a major in economics. As a University of Miami student, he was inducted into the Iron Arrow Honor Society, the highest honor awarded a student by the university.  He has also studied humanities at the University of Cambridge, England.

Political and public policy career
Johns began his political and public policy career as a Lyndon B. Johnson fellow working with Rep. Donald L. Ritter.

In 1986, he began work at The Heritage Foundation, a Washington, D.C.-based conservative think tank. Johns was an assistant editor of the Foundation's journal, Policy Review, for which he wrote on national security and foreign policy issues.

In 1988, he became a policy analyst for African and Third World affairs in the Heritage Foundation's foreign policy and defense studies department. While there, he researched and wrote on topics including South Africa, U.S. relations with Zaire and Kenya, the famine in Ethiopia, and the civil wars in Angola and Mozambique.

Johns was a White House speechwriter during the presidency of George H. W. Bush.

He has also worked for New Jersey governor and 9/11 Commission chairman Thomas Kean, Sen. Olympia Snowe and at the International Republican Institute.

Johns has been a spokesman for the Tea Party movement. He has served on the leadership team of the Nationwide Tea Party Coalition.

Health care career
Johns was vice president of Gentiva Health Services and has held senior positions at Eli Lilly and Company and Electric Mobility Corporation.

Books and commentary
Johns wrote the U.S. and Africa Statistical Handbook, and contributed to Finding Our Roots, Facing Our Future: America's 21st Century and Freedom in the World: The Annual Guide of Political Rights and Civil Liberties.

He has written for The Wall Street Journal, The Christian Science Monitor, National Review, Human Events, and other publications, and appeared as a commentator on CBS News, C-SPAN, and other media. In 2012, National Journal named him one of ten Republicans to follow on Twitter.

Personal life
Johns has been a resident of Deptford Township, New Jersey.

References

External links

 Official website
 
 

1964 births
Living people
20th-century American non-fiction writers
21st-century American businesspeople
21st-century American non-fiction writers
American economics writers
American male non-fiction writers
American foreign policy writers
American health care businesspeople
American political commentators
American political writers
American television personalities
Male television personalities
Businesspeople from Allentown, Pennsylvania
Eli Lilly and Company people
George H. W. Bush administration personnel
International relations scholars
International Republican Institute
The Heritage Foundation
Pennsylvania Republicans
People from Deptford Township, New Jersey
People from Allentown, Pennsylvania
United States presidential advisors
Writers from Allentown, Pennsylvania
Emmaus High School alumni
University of Miami Business School alumni
Alumni of Gonville and Caius College, Cambridge